Metadata publishing is the process of making metadata data elements available to external users, both people and machines using a formal review process and a commitment to change control processes.

Metadata publishing is the foundation upon which advanced distributed computing functions are being built.  But like building foundations, care must be taken in metadata publishing systems to ensure the structural integrity of the systems built on top of them.

Definition of metadata publishing
Published metadata has the following characteristics:
 Metadata structures available to the general public on a public web site or by a download
 There is a documented review and approval process for adding or updating data elements to the system
 New releases are made available without disturbing prior versions
 A publishing organization that makes a commitment to change control process

Benefits of metadata publishing
When classifying benefits of metadata publishing two groups are usually considered.  External parties are usually consumers of information that are not part of the publishing organization.  Internal parties are usually the various business units or departments within an organization.

Benefits to external parties
 Allows external systems (both people and agents) to have a clear understanding of the semantics of data elements in a system
 Allows third parties to build semantic maps between data models and import and export data between systems
 Promotes service oriented architectures and allow horizontal sharing of information between traditional information silos
 Allows systems to participate in accurately indexed and federated search processes

Benefits to internal parties
 allows parties from diverse business units to agree on shared data definitions and separate department or function specific definitions
 makes Extract, transform, load (ETL) operations more precise for data warehousing
 allows user interface designers to access a common pool of screen and report header labels
 promotion of model-driven architecture

Objections to metadata publishing
 Organizations that publish their metadata could make it easier for unauthorized people to find sensitive data if they breach an organization's firewall
 Vendors that publish their metadata risk customers creating tools that could allow their customers to export their data from computer systems, therefore making it easier to migrate off of a vendor's system

Core process in metadata publishing
The following are some of the core processes in metadata publishing
 Gathering of metadata requirements
 Selection of metadata registry and metadata publishing tools
 Training of metadata concepts to project participants
 Stakeholder group formation
 Metadata harvesting
 Glossary consolidation
 Initial upper ontology construction (abstract data elements)
 Draft data element loading
 Data element review process
 Publishing approved metadata elements in a variety of output formats (see below)
 Creation and maintenance of versions and depreciation of unused or redundant data elements

File format metadata publishing
Organizations that create applications that store data in file systems can also publish metadata definitions.  One common way to perform this is to store application data in a compressed XML file format.  The XML files can be uncompressed and validated against an external XML Schema.  An example of this is done by the Open Source FreeMind tool.

Metadata publishing formats
 HTML - used for browsing a web site and indexing by text-based search engines
 Web Ontology Language (OWL) - used by metadata search engines such as Swoogle
 XML Metadata Interchange (XMI) - OMG standard for exchanging metadata
 Common Warehouse Metamodel (CMW) - OMG standard for data warehouse metadata
 Topic maps - an ISO standard for the representation and interchange of knowledge, with an emphasis on the findability of information.
 KM3 or Kernel Meta Meta Model as used in the Metamodel Zoos. The AtlanticZoo is an open source library of more than 100 metamodels under EPL License.   KM3 is a simple Domain Specific Language for specifying metamodels. A number of transformations are available to translate from KM3 to other notations like XMI.

See also
Bibliographic database
Data governance
metadata
Semantic web
Semantic technology
Metadata registry
ISO/IEC 11179
Topic Maps

External links
 MetaQuery examples provided by Ambient Webs LLC
 SWED portal provided by WordPressHelp
 Microsoft Metadata Publishing Example

 
Electronic publishing
Publishing